Qizlar (also Romanized as Qīzlar and Qezlar) is a village in Atrak Rural District, Dashli Borun District, Gonbad-e Qabus County, Golestan Province, Iran, near the border with Turkmenistan, to the north. At the 2006 census, its population was 427, in 87 families.

References 

Populated places in Gonbad-e Kavus County